Satish Chandra Mittal (born 1938), is a retired professor of modern Indian history, Kurukshetra University, Haryana, India, and national president of the All India Itihas Sankalan Yojana, a subsidiary of RSS, a Hindu-nationalist organisation. He has authored more than 36 books including Freedom Movement in Punjab (1905-1929), Sources of National Movement (1919-1920) and Haryana: A Historical Perspective (1761-1966). He was one of the six people who demanded a ban on Wendy Doniger’s book The Hindus: An Alternative History.

Selected publications

Books
 Freedom Movement in Punjab, 1905-29. Concept Publishing, 1977. 
 India distorted: A study of British historians on India. M.D. Publications, 1995. 
 A selected annotated bibliography on freedom movement in India : Punjab and Haryana, 1858-1947. Aditya Prakashan, New Delhi, 1992. 
 Haryana, a historical perspective. Atlantic Publishers & Distributors, New Delhi, 1986. 
 Modern India : a textbook for class XII. National Council of Educational Research and Training, 2003.

Papers
"The Political Influence on Punjab Census ; A Case Study of The Role of The British in the Growth of Hindu-Sikh Tension", Proceedings of the Indian History Congress. Vol. 50, Golden Jubilee Session (1989), pp. 444–454.

See also
James Talboys Wheeler

References 

20th-century Indian historians
1938 births
Living people
Academic staff of Kurukshetra University
Indian Hindus